Unibanco S.A. was a Brazilian bank which operated from 1924 to 2009, when it was merged into Banco Itaú. The name stood for União de Bancos Brasileiros ("Union of Brazilian Banks").

Foundation
In 1924 João Moreira Salles established the Casa Bancária Moreira Salles (Moreira Salles Banking House) in the city of Poços de Caldas, state of Minas Gerais. His son, Walter Moreira Salles, was named an acting partner in 1933 at the young age of twenty-one.

Regional mergers
During 1940, Banco Moreira Salles catalyzed its growth by merging with three regional banks, eventually changing its name to União de Bancos Brasileiros (Unibanco).

Acquisition of Banco Nacional
In time its headquarters moved to São Paulo, in the homonymous state, Brazil's largest financial center. Unibanco grew to be the third largest non-government bank in the country, largely due to the 1995 acquisition of Banco Nacional, which went bankrupt alongside other major financial houses during the national banking meltdown of the early years of the Real Plan.

Listed, family controlled, company
Even though its shares were listed on the São Paulo Stock Exchange (Bovespa), the bank was largely controlled by its founding Moreira Salles family. Until his death in 2001, Walter Moreira Salles - a renowned banker and diplomat, who served as Brazilian ambassador to the United States, as well as Brazilian Finance Minister - headed the family. After 2006, his son Pedro Moreira Salles served as the company's Chief Executive Officer and Vice Chairman of the Board.

Merger with Banco Itaú

On November 2, 2008, Unibanco and the second largest Brazilian private banking group, Banco Itaú, announced plans for a merger. The merger was approved by the Central Bank of Brazil in late February 2009. As a result of the merger process, Unibanco agencies became new Itaú agencies by the end of 2010, and the Itaú name became the strongest brand in the Brazilian private sector banking market. The defunct bank's name survives in the new merged bank's holding company, which became Itaú Unibanco Holding S.A. However, only the Itaú brand is now used in the bank's corporate image.

References

External links
Official site: unibanco.com.br; now automatically forwarded to www.itau.com.br.

Itaúsa
Itaú Unibanco
Banks established in 1924
Banks disestablished in 2008
Defunct banks of Brazil